The Best Way to Walk (French: La meilleure façon de marcher) is a 1976 French film directed by Claude Miller, his directorial debut. It stars Patrick Dewaere, Patrick Bouchitey, Christine Pascal, Claude Piéplu and Michel Blanc.

Plot 
Marc and Philippe are two teenage summer-camp counselors at a vacation camp somewhere in the French country in 1960. Marc is very virile, while Philippe is more reserved. One night, Marc surprises Philippe dressed and made-up like a woman. From now on, he will keep on humiliating Philippe. Despite their late-adolescent rivalries and sexual confusion, each of them achieves some sort of awakening.

Awards
The film won the César Award for Best Cinematography, and was nominated for Best Film, Best Actor, Best Director, Best Writing and Best Sound.

Cast 
 Patrick Dewaere as Marc
 Patrick Bouchitey as Philippe
 Christine Pascal as Chantal
 Claude Piéplu as Camp director
 Marc Chapiteau as Gérard
 Michel Blanc as Raoul Deloux
 Michel Such as Léni
 Franck d'Ascanio as Hervé
 Nathan Miller as kid with glasses

References

External links 

1976 drama films
1976 films
Bisexuality-related films
1976 LGBT-related films
Films directed by Claude Miller
1970s French-language films
French LGBT-related films
Male bisexuality in film
1976 directorial debut films
1970s French films